Jagi may refer to:

 Jagi, Iran, a village
 Jagi (Fist of the North Star), a fictional character
 G. Jagi, field hockey player of Afghanistan
 L. Jagi Lamplighter, American writer

See also 
 Jugi (disambiguation)
 Jaggi, a given name and surname
 Jõgi, Estonian surname